Diego Javier Benítez (born 18 February 1991 in Encarnación) is a Paraguayan professional footballer who plays as a midfielder.

Teams
 12 de Octubre 2005–2006
 Textil Mandiyú 2006–2007
 San Luis de Quillota 2008
 Textil Mandiyú 2009-2010
 Olimpia 2010
 San Lorenzo 2011
 12 de Octubre 2011
 Sportivo Carapegua 2012–2013
 Atlético Cali 2016

External links
 
 

1991 births
Living people
Paraguayan footballers
Association football midfielders
Club Sportivo San Lorenzo footballers
Club Olimpia footballers
12 de Octubre Football Club players
Sportivo Carapeguá footballers
San Luis de Quillota footballers
Primera B de Chile players
Paraguayan expatriate footballers
Paraguayan expatriate sportspeople in Chile
Expatriate footballers in Chile
Paraguayan expatriate sportspeople in Argentina
Expatriate footballers in Argentina